The Andean Community (CAN) is a free trade area with the objective of creating a customs union comprising the South American countries of Bolivia, Colombia, Ecuador, and  Peru. The trade bloc was called the Andean Pact until 1996 and came into existence when the Cartagena Agreement was signed in 1969. Its headquarters are in Lima, Peru.

The Andean Community has 113 million inhabitants over an area of 4,700,000 km². Its GDP has gone up to US$745.300 billion in 2005, including Venezuela, which was a member at the time. Its estimated PPP of GDP for 2011 amounts to US$902.86 billion, excluding Venezuela.

Membership

The original Andean Pact was founded in 1969 by Bolivia, Chile, Colombia, Ecuador, and Peru. In 1973 the pact gained its sixth member, Venezuela. In 1976 however, its membership was again reduced to five when Chile withdrew. Venezuela announced its withdrawal in 2006, reducing the Andean Community to four member states.

Recently, with the new cooperation agreement with Mercosur, the Andean Community gained four new associate members: Argentina, Brazil, Paraguay, and Uruguay. These four Mercosur members were granted associate membership by the Andean Council of Foreign Ministers meeting in an enlarged session with the Commission (of the Andean Community) on July 7, 2005. This moves reciprocates the actions of Mercosur which granted associate membership to all the Andean Community nations by virtue of the Economic Complementarity Agreements (Free Trade agreements) signed between the CAN and individual Mercosur members.

 Current members:
 (1969)
  (1969)
 (1969)
 (1969)
 Associate members: 
  (2005)
  (2005)
  (2005)
  (2005)
   (2006)
 Observer countries: 

 
 
 Former full members:
  (1973–2006), joined Mercosur
  (full member 1969–1976, observer 1976–2006, associate member since 2006)

Relationship with other organizations 

The Andean Community and Mercosur comprise the two main trading blocs of South America. In 1999, these organizations began negotiating a merger with a view to creating a "South American Free Trade Area" (SAFTA). On December 8, 2004, the Andean Community (CAN) signed a cooperation agreement with Mercosur and they published a joint letter of intention for future negotiations towards integrating all of South America in a Union of South American Nations (USAN), patterned after the European Union.

During 2005, Venezuela decided to join Mercosur. Venezuela's official position first appeared to be that, by joining Mercosur, further steps could be taken towards integrating both trade blocs. CAN Secretary General Allan Wagner stated that the Venezuelan Foreign Minister Alí Rodríguez had declared that Venezuela did not intend to leave the CAN, and its simultaneous membership to both blocs marked the beginning of their integration.

However some analysts interpreted that Venezuela might eventually leave the CAN in the process. As Colombia and Peru signed free trade agreements with the United States, in protest the Venezuelan President Hugo Chávez indeed announced in April 2006 his country's withdrawal from the CAN, stating that the Community is "dead". Officials in Colombia and Peru expressed their disagreement with this view, as did representatives from Venezuela's industrial sector (Conindustria).

In spite of this announcement, Venezuela still had not formally completed all the necessary withdrawal procedures. According to Venezuela's Commerce Minister María Cristina Iglesias, the entire process was going to take up five years. Until then, Venezuela and its partners would remain bound by the effects of the community's preexisting commercial agreements.

During a visit to Colombia in August 2007, President Hugo Chávez was asked by the presidents of Ecuador and Bolivia to rejoin the Andean Community, and he responded that he would agree. Meanwhile, at that time the Mercosur's relations with Venezuela were weakening as Mercosur was not agreeing with some of the Hugo Chávez's proposals.

Eventually Venezuela achieved the full membership of the Mercosur in 2012, making the Mercosur bigger in number of members than the CAN for the first time.

In addition to CAN, Bolivia is also a member of the WTO, UNASUR, and ALBA. Its attitude is considered crucial to relations between UNASUR and ALBA specifically, says Marion Hörmann, since Bolivia is traditionally seen as a mediator between the Andean countries and the rest of South America.

Furthermore, in December 7, 2012, the Bolivian nation was accepted by the Mercosur countries to start the incorporation protocols to achieve the Mercosur full membership in a matter of 4 years, receiving the proclamation of an accessing member, and further consolidating itself as a strategic geopolitical nation.

History 

The groundwork for the Community was established in 1969 in the Cartagena Agreement
In 1973 Venezuela joins Andean Pact
In 1976, Augusto Pinochet withdrew Chile from the Andean Pact claiming economic incompatibilities
In 1979, the treaty creating the Court of Justice was signed, and the Andean Parliament which in  principle was located in Lima, increated and the Andean Council of Foreign Ministers were created.
In 1981 the Andean Parliament moves to Bogotá.
In 1983, the treaty creating the Court of Justice entered into effect
In 1991, the presidents approved the open skies policy and agree to intensify integration
In 1992, Peru temporarily suspended its obligations under the Liberalization Program
In 1993, the Free Trade Zone entered into full operation for Bolivia, Colombia, Ecuador, and Venezuela
In 1994, the Common External Tariff was approved
In 1996, the Cartagena Agreement Commission approved the regulatory context for the establishment, operation, and exploitation of the Simón Bolívar Satellite System
In March 1996, through the Trujillo Protocol, institutional reforms were introduced: The Andean Community was created and the Andean Integration System was established.
In 1997, an agreement was reached for Peru's gradual incorporation into the Andean Free Trade Zone
In 1998, the Framework Agreement for the creation of a Free Trade Area between the Andean Community and the Mercosur was signed in Buenos Aires
In 2000, a meeting of the South American Presidents, at which the Andean Community Heads of State and Mercosur decide to launch negotiations for establishing a free trade area between the two blocs as rapidly as possible and by January 2002 at the latest
In August 2003, the Andean Community and Mercosur Foreign Ministers, during a meeting in Montevideo at which the CAN delivered a working proposal containing guidelines for the negotiation, reaffirmed their governments' political determination to move ahead with the negotiation of a free trade agreement between the two blocs
In April 2006 President Hugo Chávez announced that Venezuela would withdraw from the Andean Community, claiming the FTA agreements signed by Colombia and Peru with the United States caused irreparable damage to the community
On 23 March 2017, a Memorandum of Understanding was signed between the Andean Community and the Eurasian Union
On 21 February 2020, disputed interim president of Venezuela Juan Guaidó announced Venezuela's reentry into CAN

Organization
 Andean Presidential Council
 Andean Foreign Relations Ministers Council (Lima, Peru)
 Commission (Lima, Peru)
 Headquarters (Lima, Peru)
 Andean Court of Justice (Quito, Ecuador)
 Andean Parliament (Bogotá, Colombia)
 Latin American Reserve Fund  (Bogotá, Colombia and Lima, Peru)
 Simón Bolívar Andean University (Sucre, Bolivia and Quito, Ecuador)
Andean Health Organization (Lima, Peru)
CAF – Development Bank of Latin America (Caracas, Venezuela)

Secretaries-General
 Sebastián Alegrett (Venezuela) 1997–2002
 Guillermo Fernández de Soto (Colombia) 2002–2004
 Edward Allan Wagner Tizón (Peru) 2004–2006
 Alfredo Fuentes Hernández (Colombia), interim 2006–2007
 Freddy Ehlers (Ecuador), 2007–2010
 Adalid Contreras Baspineiro (Bolivia), interim 2010–2011, 2011–2013
 Pablo Guzmán Laugier (Bolivia), 2013–2016 
 Walker San Miguel (Bolivia), 2016–present

Free flow of people
Since January 1, 2005, the citizens of the member countries can enter the other Andean Community member states without the requirement of a visa. Travellers should present the authorities their national ID cards.

Visitors to Venezuela will have to present their passports; they will then receive the Andean Migration Card (Tarjeta Andina de Migración), in which the time of temporary residence in the country is stated.

Andean passport

The Andean passport was created in June 2001 pursuant to Decisión 504. This stipulates the issuing of a passport based on a standard model which contains harmonised features of nomenclature and security. The passport is effective in Ecuador, Peru, Venezuela and Bolivia (Bolivia since early 2006).

See also

 Central American Common Market
 Community of Latin American and Caribbean States
 Customs Union
 Free Trade Area of the Americas
 Mercosur
 Trade bloc
 Union of South American Nations
 Rules of Origin
 Market access
 Free-trade area
 Tariffs

References

External links

Official Andean Community website— 
BBC.uk: "South America launches trading bloc" —

 
Andes
Customs unions
Free trade agreements
Trade blocs
Development in South America
South American integration
Economic policy in South America
Economy of South America
International organizations based in the Americas
Intergovernmental organizations established by treaty
Territorial entities in South America
Union of South American Nations
United Nations General Assembly observers
Economy of Bolivia
Economy of Colombia
Economy of Ecuador
Economy of Peru
Foreign relations of Bolivia
Foreign relations of Colombia
Free trade agreements of Colombia
Foreign relations of Ecuador
Foreign relations of Peru
1969 in economics
Organizations established in 1969
Organizations established in 1996
1969 establishments in South America
1996 establishments in South America